Cilene Rocha (born 19 June 1967), also known as Cilene Drewnick, is a Brazilian volleyball coach and former player. She competed in the women's tournament at the 1992 Summer Olympics.

At club level, she competed in the Brazilian Superligue with Osasco Voleibol Clube and with Volley Bergamo in the Italian Women's Volleyball League. 

She coached the Brazilian and USA national volleyball team.

References

1967 births
Living people
Brazilian women's volleyball players
Olympic volleyball players of Brazil
Volleyball players at the 1992 Summer Olympics
Sportspeople from Brasília